Lovely's Purchase (also Lovely's Donation), was part of the early nineteenth century Missouri and Arkansaw territories.  It was created in 1817, in order to give a haven to the Cherokee and other Native Americans who were steadily leaving the southeastern United States and moving west to Indian Territory (modern Oklahoma) through territory then inhabited by sometimes hostile White settlers and several other Indian tribes, especially members of the Osage Indian Nation. Following years of political maneuvering and sometimes conflicting treaties, the Purchase was finally split between the Cherokee and White settlers, with the larger section going solely to the Cherokee Nation.

Background
President James Monroe had promised an exclusive "gateway to the setting sun"—an area devoted to settlement for the members of the Cherokee Nation where they were not "...surrounded by the White man." Starting in 1809, members of the Cherokee Nation living west of the Appalachians in Tennessee, Georgia, Alabama, and the Carolinas, had started migrating west to the lands set aside by the United States government for those tribal members willing to exchange their eastern property for homesteads in the recently set-aside Indian Territory. A route was planned by the U.S. federal government with the purpose to insulate newly arriving Cherokee to the area from interference and harassment by hostile American settlers and warriors from other Indian Nations. These others lived, hunted, and had (in many instances) squatted on the promised tracts of land. They viewed the Cherokee as rivals.

The Osage Nation had given-up exclusive hunting rights to the area that would become a large part of Lovely's Purchase in the 1808 Treaty of Fort Clark.  They still owned the land outright, however, and maintained several settlements on it. The new Cherokee migrants came into almost immediate conflict with Native and White settlers who had preemptively occupied lands along the route. This included members of the Quapaw tribe and the Osage Indian Nation, as well as other Indian nations, who held a special animosity towards what they viewed as Cherokee usurpers of their lands and way of life. Violent incidents continued to plague both groups, however, and peaked in 1817 following Lovely's death. The next year saw the arrival from the east of a strong Cherokee leader, John Jolly, and these incidents grew less frequent, although they still occasionally occurred.

Purchase history

Major Lovely

Major William Lovely, an assistant Indian agent to the Tennessee Cherokee, was promoted to Indian agent of the Missouri Territory (Arkansas Region), and sent to quell these frontier disturbances in the Missouri Territory. He held the position from 1813 to 1817. His wife, Persis, accompanied him to "...an abandoned Osage village far from what [is] considered civilization..." Lovely, a veteran of the Revolutionary War, made several failed diplomatic attempts to make peace between the warring Osage and Cherokee transplants to Indian Territory. His ultimate solution was to create a large strip of land to act as a buffer between the people of the two nations.

Lovely's Purchase, set in the early Arkansaw District of the Missouri Territory, was created as a buffer zone to separate the adversarial Cherokee and Osage Indian Nations. In the summer of 1813, Land agent Lovely was sent to administer the first section of acreage that would eventually belong to the Purchase. This land comprised approximately four million acres that had been ceded to the federal goverment in 1808 by the Osage Nation. At Lovely's behest, another treaty summit took place on July 9, 1816 at the mouth of the Verdigris River. At this time, and on his own authority, Lovely agreed to buy an additional three million hunting acres of Osage land that was located between the Verdigris and White Rivers on behalf of the Cherokee. All together, the treaty lands ceded by, and bought from, the Osage totaled over seven million acres. The area began to be referred to as Lovely's Purchase thereafter. The entire northwest corner of the Arkansas Territory now belonged to the Cherokee. Both the Osage and the Cherokee pledged to honor the 1816 treaty, although the federal government had not authorized nor had it endorsed it, and therefore did not officially recognize its terms.

Military intervention
The treaty, however, still did not stop the violence between members of the two groups. Due to the buffer area not living up to expectations, in 1817 the U.S. Army built Fort Smith, and the federal government made it clear that Lovely's purchase would only house Native Americans from that time on. Another treaty between Osage and Cherokee was signed in 1818 at St. Louis, one that finally formalized the earlier Lovely's Purchase, and was this time endorsed by the U.S. federal government.

In 1819 Arkansas was separated from the Missouri Territory, and became an official organized territory of the United States. Lovely's Purchase was made part of Crawford County at that time. In 1822, due to requests by Territorial Governor James Miller, the U.S. government authorized another outpost and established Fort Gibson (finished in 1824). Fort Gibson was manned by the U.S. Seventh Infantry. The large area these forts oversaw was dubbed "Lovely's Donations" by later legislators. The area still remained contentious, with complaints to the legislators from both White settlers—who were continually being moved out of the ever expanding Lovely Purchase—and the Cherokee—who were being pressured to abandon the rich farmlands and salt mine tracts to the American frontiersmen.

Lovely County

A sutler by the name of John Nicks accompanied the Seventh Infantry to Ft. Gibson, and eventually settled in the area of the fort. In 1828, he founded Nicksville, the future capital of Lovely County. More than a decade after Lovely's 1817 death, the area—along with additional tracts of purchased and donated land—was incorporated by the Territory of Arkansas as the short-lived Lovely County.

Lovely's Purchase was, without federal authorization, created a county by the Arkansas legislature in 1827 in an effort to keep the area part of the planned State of Arkansas, and American frontiersmen immediately started settling there. Lovely County only existed from October 31, 1827, to May 6, 1828, when the federal government signed The 1828 U.S.–Cherokee Treaty of Washington. Lovely County had included all or part of present-day Benton, Washington, Crawford counties in Arkansas; plus all or part of present-day Delaware, Sequoyah, Adair, Cherokee, Wagoner, Muskogee, and Mayes counties in Oklahoma. The new treaty authorized the western half of the land donations, accumulations, and homestead purchases that had created the 'Lovely Purchase' to became part of Indian Territory. The land was given entirely to the Cherokee Nation—West of the Mississippi, while the Osage were moved to the unorganized territory of Kansas—to finally put an end to the hostilities. The eastern part of the Purchase remained with Arkansas and the American frontiersmen. To expedite completion of the compromise, any displaced Indian was given: "...a good rifle, a blanket, a kettle, and 5 lbs. of tobacco when he agreed to move..." while any displaced frontier settler was awarded with: "...upto 320 acres of public domain land in Arkansas Territory for every head of household over the age of 21 years."

Notes

References

Further reading
 Bolton, S. Charles; Territorial Ambition : Land and Society in Arkansas 1800–1840; Fayetteville: University of Arkansas Press; (1993)

External links
 Lovely County defined
 ''Contemporaneous Map of Lovely's Purchase; 1827
 Maps of the Lovely Donations; Historical Documents, Maps & Roster of Claims regarding the Lovely Donations (1828)

United States and Native American treaties
Histories of territories of the United States
Colonization history of the United States